Profanity in the Korean language is referred to as 욕/辱 (yok, insults or swearing). Several of these words have linguistic and historical significance. Various words have different origins. The Korean term for dog, 'gae', for example, can be used in everyday speech with no offensive connotation. When applied to a person, however, 'gae' and its variants (including 개새끼 'Gaesaekki', literally 'son of a dog', and 'son of a bitch' in English) become strong curse words that would not be appropriate for formal or polite conversation.

List of Korean profanities
엠창 (em-chang, --) : Your mother is a prostitute. 엠 means mother that is used as slang, swearing. and 창 means 창녀(chang-nyeo), which means prostitute. It is also used when strongly arguing that what you say is true. If the word is wrong, it means that his mother is a prostitute.
느금마 (neu-geum-ma, --) : Your mother(is a prostitute). which is same meaning 니애미(ni-ae-mi), 너희 어머니(neo-hui-eo-meo-ni), 너검마(neo_geomma), 니엄마(ni-eomma)
느갭 (neu-gaeb, --) : Ask your father's regards. which is same same meaning 느그애비(neu-gu-ae-bi), 느개비(neu-gae-bi). 
놈 (nom, --): a male person in a degrading/derogatory manner. Roughly equivalent to the English word "bastard" or "punk"
년 (nyeon, --): Female version of 놈. A female person in a degrading/derogatory manner. Roughly equivalent to the English word "wench" or "bitch" however can also mean year
촌놈 (chon-nom, -): Roughly equivalent to the English phrase "country bumpkin". A combination of the noun 촌 (chon), which refers to rural areas and countryside, and the noun 놈 (nom)
미친놈/미친년 (mi-chin-nom, ---)/(mi-chin-nyeon, ---): Translates literally to "crazy bastard/bitch". A combination of the adjective 미친 (mi-chin), which translates to crazy or insane, and the word 놈 (nom)/년 (nyeon)
걸레같은 년 (geol-le-gat-eun-nyeon, ----): Used similarly to words such as "whore" or "slut". The adjective 걸레같은 (geol-le-gat-eun) means "rag-like" (meaning whore-like) and the phrase 걸레같은 년 translates literally to "a bitch who is like a rag" and refers to women who are promiscuous and thus, dirty and tattered/worn out/used up like a rag. The phrase can be abbreviated in use as 걸레년 (geol-le-nyeon).
새끼 (sae-kki, --): A noun used to derogatorily refer to any general person. The word, when not used as a profanity, is used to describe a young of an animal. Note it can also be used affectionately too.
개새끼 (gae-sae-kki, ---): Equivalent to the English phrase "son of a bitch". Combination of the word 개 (gae), meaning dog, and the word 새끼 (sae-kki), meaning offspring or young. 
씹새끼 (ship-sae-kki, ---): Combination of the word 씹 (sship), an archaic word that could either refer to a vagina or sexual intercourse, and the word 새끼 (sae-kki), meaning offspring or young. 
지랄 (ji-ral, --): A word, as a verb, means to talk incessantly and nonsensically. The word originates from the word 지랄병 (ji-ral-byeong, --), an archaic and outdated word, generically encompassing a number of separate neurological disorders with similar symptoms such as seizures, tics and spasms. 
병신 (byeong-shin): A noun that roughly translates to "moron" or "retard". It is a compound of the word 병 (byeong, 病), meaning "of disease" or "diseased", and the word 신(shin), a word meaning "body" originating from the Chinese character. This word originally refers to disabled individuals, but in modern Korean is commonly used as an insult with meanings varying contextually from "jerk" to "dumbass" or "dickhead."
또라이 (tto-rai, ---): A noun that translates to "nutjob" or just describes someone who is nonsensical or crazy. 
씨발 (ssi-bal, --): (as an intensifier) fucking, fucker; (as an interjection) fuck!, shit! The word originates from an archaic verb 씹하다 which originally meant to perform a sexual intercourse but is often just used as a sex-related profanity
보지(씹) (bo-ji(ssib), --): A derogatory term for a vagina (slang) woman
좆 (jot, -): A derogatory term for a penis. Colloquially, it can be used in combination with other profanities as an intensifier(for example : 좆까, 존나).
꺼져 (kkeo-jyeo, --): (interjection) Get the fuck out of here, go to Hell, beat it.
엿먹어 (yeot-meog-eo, ---): Fuck you (lit. ″Eat yeot″)
젠장 (jen-jang, --): Shit, goddamn, damn it
좆지랄 (jot ji-ral): worse version of "ji-ral."

References

Korean language
Profanity by language